The women's 4 x 400 metres relay event at the 2015 Summer Universiade was held on 12 July at the Gwangju Universiade Main Stadium.

Results

References

Relay
2015